Simon de Tosny (Toni, Tonei, Toeni, Toeny, Toney) was a 12th-century Cistercian monk and prelate. Simon was a monk of Melrose Abbey, and served there until he moved to become Abbot of Coggeshall Abbey in Essex. He resigned this abbey in 1168, and returned to Melrose. In 1171, he was elected as Bishop of Moray, and was consecrated at St Andrews on 23 January 1172. He was a distant cousin of King William who may or may not have played some part in his election. His cathedral was at Birnie, Moray. He witnessed several charters and was present at the Council of Northampton in 1176. He is the first bishop named on the bishop-list in the Moray Registrum. He died on 17 September 1184 and was buried in Birnie Kirk. Aside from the brief episcopate of Andrew (consecrated 1184, died 1185) he was succeeded as bishop by Richard de Lincoln.

Notes

References
 Dowden, John, The Bishops of Scotland, ed. J. Maitland Thomson, (Glasgow, 1912)
 Fawcett, Richard & Oram, Richard, Elgin Cathedral and the Diocese of Moray, Historic Scotland (Edinburgh, 2014), 
 Keith, Robert, An Historical Catalogue of the Scottish Bishops: Down to the Year 1688, (London, 1924)
 Pennant, T. "A Tour in Scotland 1769" (London, 1790)
 Watt, D.E.R., Fasti Ecclesiae Scotinanae Medii Aevi ad annum 1638, 2nd Draft, (St Andrews, 1969)

External links
 Houses of Cistercian monks Abbey of Coggeshall (BHO)

1184 deaths
English abbots
Bishops of Moray
English Cistercians
Scoto-Normans
12th-century Scottish Roman Catholic bishops
Year of birth unknown
12th-century English people